

References
  (Gln)
  (D)
  (L)

Chemical data pages
Chemical data pages cleanup